The 11th Golden Laurel Awards (also known as 2000 Golden Laurel Awards), honoring the best film and television producers of 1999, were held at The Century Plaza Hotel in Los Angeles, California on March 2, 2000. The nominees were announced on January 19, 2000.

Winners and nominees

Film
{| class=wikitable style="width="100%"
|-
! colspan="2" style="background:#abcdef;"| Darryl F. Zanuck Award for Outstanding Producer of Theatrical Motion Pictures
|-
| colspan="2" style="vertical-align:top;"|
 American Beauty – Bruce Cohen and Dan Jinks Being John Malkovich – Michael Stipe, Sandy Stern, Steve Golin, and Vincent Landay
 The Cider House Rules – Richard N. Gladstein
 The Hurricane – Norman Jewison, Armyan Bernstein, and John Ketcham
 The Insider – Michael Mann and Pieter Jan Brugge
|}

Television

David O. Selznick Lifetime Achievement Award in Theatrical Motion PicturesJerry BruckheimerDavid Susskind Lifetime Achievement Award in Television
 Aaron SpellingMilestone AwardSherry LansingNova Award for Most Promising Producer
Theatrical Motion Pictures: Robin Cowie and Gregg Hale for The Blair Witch Project
Television: Aaron Sorkin for Sports Night and The West Wing

PGA Hall of Fame
Theatrical Motion Pictures: Robert Evans for Chinatown, Kathleen Kennedy and Steven Spielberg for E.T. the Extra-Terrestrial, and Billy Wilder for Some Like It Hot
Television: Marcy Carsey and Tom Werner for The Cosby Show, Jack Webb for Dragnet, and Quinn Martin and Alan Armer for The Fugitive

Vision Award
Theatrical Motion Pictures: Michael Stipe, Sandy Stern, Steve Golin, and Vincent Landay for Being John Malkovich
Television: John Wells for ER, Third Watch and The West Wing

References

External links
2000 PGA Awards - IMDB

 1999
1999 film awards
1999 television awards
2000 in California